Cham or CHAM may refer to:

Ethnicities and languages 
Chams, people in Vietnam and Cambodia
Cham language, the language of the Cham people
Cham script
Cham (Unicode block), a block of Unicode characters of the Cham script
Cham Albanians, also spelled Çam, a people originating in northern Greece of Albanian descent
Cham Albanian dialect

People
Cham (singer) (born 1979), Jamaica reggae singer known for the single "Ghetto Story"
Cham., standard author abbreviation for botanist Adelbert von Chamisso (1781–1838)
Chamillionaire (born 1979), American rapper
Cham Prasidh (born 1951), Cambodian Minister of Trade
Adongo Agada Cham (1959–2011), king of the Anuak people of Sudan and Ethiopia
Jorge Cham (born 1976), comic-book artist
Patrick Cham (born 1959), French basketball player
Amédée de Noé (1818–1879), French artist whose pseudonym was "Cham"
Ham (son of Noah), also spelt Cham
Cham, a variant in Gambia of the surname Thiam

Places
Cham, Germany, town
Cham (district), Germany
Cham, Switzerland, a city in the Canton of Zug, Switzerland
Cham, Iran (disambiguation)
Chàm Islands, of Vietnam
Cham, a colloquial name for the French mountain town of Chamonix
Al Cham, French spelling for Al Sham (comprises Israel, Syria, Lebanon and Jordan)

Other uses
 Centro de Humanidades, NOVA FCSH
Cham (novel), by British writer Jonathan Trigell set in Chamonix Mont Blanc
Cham Bank, a Syrian bank
Cham dance, a masked dance associated with some sects of Buddhism
Cham Palaces and Hotels, a Syria hotel chain based in Syria
CHAM (AM), a radio station in Hamilton, Ontario, Canada
Cham Wings Airlines, a privately owned Syrian airline
Children's Hospital at Montefiore, in New York
Cham, an archaic spelling of Khan
Cham., taxonomic author abbreviation of German botanist Adelbert von Chamisso (1781–1838)
 Cham or Kopi Cham, Malaysian beverage of coffee and tea
 CHAM! was a fictional J-Pop group in the animated film Perfect Blue

See also
Chamcham, or Chomchom, a traditional Bengali sweet
Chameria, part of Albania inhabited by Cham Albanians
Kham (disambiguation)
Chamm, a 2017 Punjabi film
Çam (disambiguation)

Language and nationality disambiguation pages

Senegalese surnames
Gambian surnames